Tubby the Tuba is a 1947 American animated short film from Paramount Pictures, directed by George Pal as part of his Puppetoons series. It was based on the original song by Paul Tripp and George Kleinsinger. The film features narration by Victor Jory.

The film received an Academy Award nomination for Best Animated Short, but lost to Warner Bros. Cartoons' Merrie Melodies cartoon Tweetie Pie. A feature-length version was released in 1975 by AVCO Embassy. The 1987 compilation feature, The Puppetoon Movie, featured the original short in its entirety.

Plot
This story takes place in an orchestra featuring, among each other, a piccolo (Peepo), a flute, an oboe, a clarinet, a bassoon, a trumpet, a French horn, a trombone, a tuba (Tubby), a violin, a cello, a double bass, a xylophone, cymbals, a timpani and a celeste. Tubby, the orchestra's tuba, comments after a rehearsal's warmup that he is tired of playing only the bass line. This draws ridicule from the other instruments, and Tubby runs off crying to a nearby creek. A frog who lives there consoles Tubby; both are treated poorly, as neither is thought to be capable or worthy of a solo. The frog teaches Tubby a melody and the two part ways.

The next day, at the warmup, Tubby begins playing his newly learned melody. The orchestral instruments are shocked, but are encouraged to let the tuba have his solo by their conductor. With the frog's help, Tubby gets to play his solo.

Production and release
The film was recorded in 1946 (according to the copyright notice), but remained unreleased for seven months until its final release on July 11, 1947.

References

External links
 
 
 Tubby the Tuba on TCM

1947 films
1947 animated films
American animated short films
Short films directed by George Pal
Paramount Pictures short films
Puppetoons
Stop-motion animated short films
1940s American films